Frederick James may refer to:

 Frederick James (artist) (1845–1907), American artist
 Frederick Alexander James (1884–1957), Australian merchant and litigant
 Frederick Ernest James (1891–1971), British colonial administrator, businessman and politician
 Frederick Seton James (1870–1934), British colonial administrator

See also
 Frederic James (1915–1985), American painter
 Fred James (disambiguation)